James Hamilton (born 9 February 1976) is a Scottish retired footballer who played as a striker in a career that saw him appear for thirteen different league clubs, including Dundee, Heart of Midlothian, Aberdeen, Dundee United, Motherwell, Dunfermline Athletic and St Mirren in the top tier. Hamilton's only major honour in club football was winning the Scottish Cup with Hearts in 1998. He appeared for the Scotland under-21 team fourteen times, scoring six goals.

Career

1990s
Born in Aberdeen and a product of the Highland Football League,Hamilton began his senior career as a part-time player with Banffshire club Keith, before moving to Premier Division side Dundee in January 1994. He spent three years at Dens Park, during which time he established himself as a player to look out for in the future. He joined Heart of Midlothian in late 1996 and enjoyed a successful spell with them, scoring 33 goals in his two and a half years with the Edinburgh club and winning the Scottish Cup in 1998. He caught the attention of Aberdeen, and followed in the footsteps of his father (also named Jim Hamilton) when he signed for them in March 1999. Hamilton cost the Dons £300,000, however his time at Pittodrie was to prove less productive as he made few appearances and scored only one league goal.

2000s
In January 2000, Dundee United signed him for £150,000, making them his fifth club to have played for. In November 2001, Hamilton became the first player in Scottish football to have a red card overturned after video evidence. In March 2003, Hamilton was told he could leave Tannadice, and due to transfer window restrictions, he surrendered his professional status to sign as an amateur for Dunfermline Athletic for the remainder of the season. Hamilton failed to win a full-time deal and signed for Scottish First Division side Ross County at the start of the 2003–04 season.

He made his return to the SPL in June 2004 when he signed for Livingston, becoming top scorer for 2004–05 with seven goals in fourteen starts for the Almondvale club. His career with Livingston was to prove short-lived, as Motherwell signed him in January and he only went on to score one goal for the Steelmen that season. The next season, he scored 11 goals in total, including the only goal in the 3–1 defeat to Celtic which won the SPL 'Goal of the Season' award, and later the SPL 'Goal of the Decade' Award.

On 29 August 2006, Hamilton re-signed for Dunfermline for an undisclosed fee, playing 34 games and scoring five goals before signing for SPL side St Mirren on 30 January 2008. After four months in Paisley, Hamilton signed a one-year contract extension.

He was released from his St Mirren contract at the end of the 2008–09 season, and signed for Partick Thistle on 9 July 2009 on a one-year contract. He scored his first goals for his new side when he scored twice in a 6–1 win at Forfar Athletic in the Scottish Challenge Cup second round. Hamilton was released by Partick Thistle in January 2010. After his release, Hamilton returned to Livingston, signing a short-term deal with the Almondvale side before being released at the end of the season.

2010s
Into his third decade as a professional footballer, Hamilton joined Arbroath in July 2010 on a one-year deal but moved to East Fife the following January. In 2011, he began working with Total.

International career
Hamilton played 14 times for the Scotland under-21 side, 11 of those selections while playing for Dundee, making him the club's most capped player at that level.

Personal life
In addition to his father Jim who also played for Aberdeen and Dunfermline as well as East Fife, his son Robbie is an aspiring footballer who plays as a defender and signed a first professional contract with Hibernian in January 2021.

Statistics
Correct as of 28 September 2008

Honours
Dundee
Scottish Challenge Cup: runner-up 1994–95
Scottish League Cup: runner-up 1995–96

Hearts of Midlothian
 Scottish Cup: winner 1997–98

Dunfermline Athletic
 Scottish Cup: runner-up 2006–07

References

External links 

Profile at londonhearts.com

1976 births
Living people
Footballers from Aberdeen
Scottish footballers
Scottish Premier League players
Scottish Football League players
Dundee F.C. players
Aberdeen F.C. players
Heart of Midlothian F.C. players
Dundee United F.C. players
Ross County F.C. players
Motherwell F.C. players
Livingston F.C. players
Dunfermline Athletic F.C. players
St Mirren F.C. players
Partick Thistle F.C. players
Arbroath F.C. players
East Fife F.C. players
Scotland under-21 international footballers
Keith F.C. players
Association football forwards
Highland Football League players